António Martins Bordelo (born 23 August 1963) is a French long-distance runner. He competed in the men's 10,000 metres at the 1992 Summer Olympics.

References

1963 births
Living people
Athletes (track and field) at the 1992 Summer Olympics
French male long-distance runners
Olympic athletes of France
Place of birth missing (living people)
20th-century French people